A wolf man is a werewolf or lycanthrope.

Wolf man or Wolfman may also refer to:

Film
 The Wolf Man (1924 film), a silent film starring John Gilbert and Norma Shearer
 The Wolf Man (1941 film), a horror film starring Lon Chaney, Jr.
 Wolfman (1979 film), a horror film starring Earl Owensby and Kristina Reynolds
 The Wolfman (2010 film), a remake of the 1941 film starring Benicio del Toro and Anthony Hopkins
 Wolfman (Kinnikuman), a character in the manga series Kinnikuman
 The Wolfman, a 2007 documentary on British animal researcher Shaun Ellis
 Wolfman, a character in American Graffiti

In print
 "The Wolfman" (Freud essay), an essay by Sigmund Freud
 Tooth and Nail (novel) or Wolfman, an Inspector Rebus novel by Ian Rankin
 The Wolfman, a novelization of the 1941 film by Ramsey Campbell

People
 Bernard Wolfman (1924–2011), American dean of the University of Pennsylvania Law School and law professor
 Marv Wolfman (born 1946), American comic book writer
 Sergei Pankejeff (1886–1979), a patient Sigmund Freud gave the pseudonym "Wolf Man" to protect his identity
 Wolfman Jack (1938–1995), American disc jockey
 Peter Wolfe (musician) or Wolfman (born 1968), poet and musician
 David Williams (rugby league) or the Wolfman, Australian rugby league player
 The Wolfman (wrestler) (1935–2016), Hungarian/Canadian professional wrestler
 Alex "Wolfman" Story (born 1974), American punk rock/metal singer

Other uses
 Wolfman (video game), a 1988 text adventure game

See also 
 Werewolf (disambiguation)